The citron-headed yellow finch (Sicalis luteocephala) is a species of bird in the family Thraupidae. It is found in the Andes of Bolivia and far northern Argentina. Its natural habitat is subtropical or tropical high-altitude shrubland.

References

citron-headed yellow finch
Birds of the Bolivian Andes
citron-headed yellow finch
Taxonomy articles created by Polbot